Hamletsburg, Illinois is an unincorporated community in Pope County, Illinois, United States.

History
Hamletsburg was named for Hamlet Ferguson, an early settler (1814) and the first Pope county sheriff.

References

Unincorporated communities in Illinois
Unincorporated communities in Pope County, Illinois
Illinois populated places on the Ohio River